The volleyball department of the Dresdner Sportclub was founded in 1990. The women's team plays in the Bundesliga and has been German champion six times, DVV-Pokal cup winner six times and Challenge Cup winner at European level once.

, current players include Jocelynn Birks, Jenna Gray, Madeleine Gates and Swiss international Maja Storck.

Bundesliga
The Dresden women have been playing in the 1. Bundesliga since 1997. In 1999 they became German champions for the first time. In the 2007 season they were able to win the title again. In the 2007/08 season they were runner-up. In the 2008/09 season they reached third place and fourth place in 2010. In 2011, 2012 and 2013, the Dresden women were only runners up to Schweriner SC. In the 2013/14 season, the team celebrated their third championship title with three wins in the championship final against the Rote Raben Vilsbiburg. In the 2014/15 season, the Dresden women won the fourth championship title with three victories in the championship final against Allianz MTV Stuttgart. In the following season they defended the title after five finals against the same opponent. In the 2020/21 season, the Dresden women were again in the play-off final against Stuttgart. After the first two games of the best-of-five series were lost, Dresden won the remaining games and secured the championship title again.

References

German volleyball clubs
Dresdner SC
Women's volleyball in Germany